James Steven Jones (born September 24, 1988) is an American professional baseball pitcher and outfielder in the Los Angeles Dodgers organization. He was drafted by the Seattle Mariners in the fourth round of the 2009 Major League Baseball draft and made his Major League Baseball (MLB) debut with them in 2014.

Early life
Jones attended the High School of Telecommunications in Bay Ridge, Brooklyn, where he led them to a Brooklyn West Division Championship. He spent time as both a pitcher and a position player.

In 2007, Jones began attending Long Island University where in his freshman season he played 50 games, including pitching in 12 of those games. For the season he hit .299 with 10 doubles, three triples, four home runs and 32 RBIs. He also had eight stolen bases. He was primarily used as a pitcher and went 2−6 with a 7.25 ERA in 12 games, eight starts.

He started all 67 games in 2008, including 14 pitching appearances. Jones hit .309 with eight doubles, two triples, five home runs and 28 RBIs. His 41 runs and 19 stolen bases were team highs. He earned many honors including First Team All-Northeast Conference, he was named NEC Player of the Week on March 24, he was ranked 30th on Baseball America's Top 100 College Prospects List and was named top prospect in New York State by Perfect Game Crosschecker.

Going into his junior year many felt Jones was better suited as a pitcher entering the draft. Jones continued to play as a pitcher and an outfielder throughout the rest of his junior season. He was drafted by the Mariners at the end of the season as an outfielder rather than a pitcher.

Professional career

Seattle Mariners
Jones began his professional career in 2009 with the Short-Season Everett AquaSox of the Northwest League. He played 33 games in right field, seven at first base, three at designated hitter and one in left field. Jones finished the season hitting .311 with  12 doubles, two triples, three home runs and 24 RBIs. In 2010, Baseball America listed Jones as the "Best Outfield Arm" in the Seattle Mariners organization. To begin the 2010 season, Jones was assigned to the Class-A Clinton LumberKings. On the season, Jones batted .269 with 87 runs scored, 132 hits, 24 doubles, 10 triples, 12 home runs, 64 RBIs, and 24 stolen bases.

Jones was added to the 40-man roster on November 20, 2013. He was called up to the Mariners on April 16, 2014 and had his MLB debut on April 18, 2014 against the Miami Marlins. In his first at bat he beat out a ground ball to the second baseman. Following the game he was optioned back to Triple-A Tacoma. On May 5, 2014 he was recalled to the Mariners. On May 6, 2014 he recorded his second MLB hit in the first inning against the Oakland Athletics.

On May 18, 2014, Jones joined Edgar Martínez as the only players in Mariners history to hit safely in each of their first ten MLB starts. In the next game on May 20, 2014, he got a hit to set the team record for starts with a hit to begin a career. He registered a hit in each of his first 13 MLB starts.

Texas Rangers
After the 2015 season, the Mariners traded Jones, Tom Wilhelmsen, and a player to be named later (Patrick Kivlehan) to the Texas Rangers for Leonys Martín and Anthony Bass. The Rangers did not tender him a contract for 2016, so he became a free agent on December 2, 2015. He was re-signed to a minor league deal on December 10.

Jones began the 2016 season with the Round Rock Express, before transitioning into a pitcher. In August, Jones made his first appearance as a pitcher for the Arizona League Rangers. Jones missed the entire 2017 season after undergoing Tommy John surgery in 2016. In 2018, he played for the AZL Rangers, Down East Wood Ducks, Frisco RoughRiders, and the Round Rock Express, accumulating a 1–1 record with a 7.34 ERA over 30.2 innings.

Jones elected free agency on November 2, 2018. He re-signed with the Rangers to a minor league deal on February 14, 2019. Jones split the 2019 season between Frisco and the Nashville Sounds,. going a combined 3–2 with a 3.52 ERA with 71 strikeouts over 64 innings. Jones was the Texas Rangers 2019 Minor League True Ranger Award winner. He became a free agent following the 2019 season. Jones re-signed with the Rangers on a minor league deal on January 9, 2020. He elected free agency on November 10, 2022.

Los Angeles Dodgers
On December 15, 2022, Jones signed a minor league deal with the Los Angeles Dodgers.

References

External links

1988 births
Living people
African-American baseball players
Arizona Complex League Rangers players
Arizona League Mariners players
Arizona League Rangers players
Adelaide Bite players
Baseball pitchers
Baseball players from New York (state)
Clinton LumberKings players
Down East Wood Ducks players
Everett AquaSox players
Frisco RoughRiders players
Hickory Crawdads players
High Desert Mavericks players
Jackson Generals (Southern League) players
LIU Brooklyn Blackbirds baseball players
Major League Baseball outfielders
Nashville Sounds players
Round Rock Express players
Seattle Mariners players
Sportspeople from Brooklyn
Baseball players from New York City
Tacoma Rainiers players
Tigres de Aragua players
American expatriate baseball players in Venezuela
Tigres del Licey players
American expatriate baseball players in the Dominican Republic
American expatriate baseball players in Australia
21st-century African-American sportspeople
20th-century African-American people
Waterloo Bucks players
Indios de Mayagüez players